Arabidopsis (rockcress) is a genus in the family Brassicaceae. They are small flowering plants related to cabbage and mustard. This genus is of great interest since it contains thale cress (Arabidopsis thaliana), one of the model organisms used for studying plant biology and the first plant to have its entire genome sequenced. Changes in thale cress are easily observed, making it a very useful model.

Status
Currently, the genus Arabidopsis has nine species and a further eight subspecies recognised. This delimitation is quite recent and is based on morphological and molecular phylogenies by O'Kane and Al-Shehbaz and others.

Their findings confirm the species formerly included in Arabidopsis made it polyphyletic. The most recent reclassification moves two species previously placed in Cardaminopsis and Hylandra and three species of Arabis into Arabidopsis, but excludes 50 that have been moved into the new genera Beringia, Crucihimalaya, Ianhedgea, Olimarabidopsis, and Pseudoarabidopsis.

All of the species in Arabidopsis are indigenous to Europe, while two of the species have broad ranges also extending into North America and Asia.

In the last two decades, Arabidopsis thaliana has gained much interest from the scientific community as a model organism for research on numerous aspects of plant biology.  The Arabidopsis Information Resource (TAIR) is a curated online information source for Arabidopsis thaliana genetic and molecular biology research, and The Arabidopsis Book is an online compilation of invited chapters on Arabidopsis thaliana biology. (Note that as of 2013 no further chapters will be published.) In Europe, the model organism resource centre for Arabidopsis thaliana germplasm, bioinformatics and molecular biology resources (including GeneChips) is the Nottingham Arabidopsis Stock Centre (NASC) whilst in North America germplasm services are provided by the Arabidopsis Biological Resource Center (ABRC) based at the Ohio State University. The ordering system for ABRC was incorporated into the TAIR database in June 2001 whilst NASC has always (since 1991) hosted its own ordering system and genome browser.

In 1982, the crew of the Soviet Salyut 7 space station grew some Arabidopsis, thus becoming the first plants to flower and produce seeds in space. They had a life span of 40 days. Arabidopsis thaliana seeds were taken to the Moon on the Chang'e 4 lander in 2019, as part of a student experiment. As of May 2022 Arabidopsis thaliana has successfully been grown in samples of lunar soil.

Arabidopsis is quite similar to the Boechera genus.

List of species and subspecies
Arabidopsis arenicola  (Richardson ex Hook.) Al-Shehbaz, Elven, D.F. Murray & S.I. Warwick — Arctic rock cress (Greenland, Labrador, Nunavut, Québec, Ontario, Manitoba, Saskatchewan)
Arabidopsis arenosa (L.) Lawalrée — sand rock cress
A. arenosa subsp. arenosa (Europe: native in Austria, Belarus, Bosnia Herzegovina, Bulgaria, Croatia, Czech Republic, NE France, Germany, Hungary, N Italy, Latvia, Lithuania, Macedonia, Poland, Romania, Slovakia, Slovenia, Switzerland, and Ukraine; naturalized in Belgium, Denmark, Estonia, Finland, Netherlands, Norway, Russia and W Siberia, and Sweden; absent in Albania, Greece, C and S Italy, and Turkey)
A. arenosa subsp. borbasii (E Belgium, Czech Republic, NE France, Germany, Hungary, Poland, Romania, Slovakia, Switzerland, Ukraine. Doubtfully occurring in Denmark)
Arabidopsis cebennensis (D.C.) (SE France)
Arabidopsis croatica (Schott) (Bosnia, Croatia)
Arabidopsis halleri (L.)
A. halleri subsp. halleri (Austria, Croatia, Czech Republic, Germany, N and C Italy, Poland, Romania, Slovakia, Slovenia, Switzerland, and S Ukraine. Probably introduced in N France and extinct in Belgium)
A. halleri subsp. ovirensis (Wulfen) (Albania, Austria, NE Italy, Romania, Slovakia, Slovenia, SW Ukraine, Yugoslavia)
A. halleri subsp. gemmifera (Matsumura) (Russian Far East, northeastern China, Korea, Japan, and Taiwan)
Arabidopsis lyrata (L.) O'Kane & Al-Shehbaz — sand cress
A. lyrata subsp. lyrata (NE European Russia, Alaska, Canada (Ontario west into British Columbia), and southeastern and central United States (Vermont south into northern Georgia and Mississippi northward into Missouri and Minnesota))
A. lyrata subsp. petraea (Linnaeus) O'Kane & Al-Shehbaz (Austria, Czech Republic, England, Germany, Hungary, Iceland, Ireland, N. Italy, Norway, Russia (NW Russia, Siberia and Far East), Scotland, Sweden, Ukraine, boreal North America (Alaska and Yukon). Apparently extinct in Poland)
A. lyrata subsp. kamchatica (Fischer ex D.C.) O'Kane & Al-Shehbaz (boreal Alaska, Canada (Yukon, Mackenzie District, British Columbia, northern Saskatchewan), Aleutian Islands, eastern Siberia, the Russian Far East, Korea, northern China, Japan, and Taiwan)
Arabidopsis neglecta (Schultes)  (Carpathian Mountains (Poland, Romania, Slovakia, and adjacent Ukraine))
Arabidopsis pedemontana (Boiss.) (northwestern Italy and, presumably extinct, in adjacent SW Switzerland)
Arabidopsis suecica (Fries) Norrlin, Meddel. (Fennoscandinavia and the Baltic region)
Arabidopsis thaliana (L.) Heynh. — thale cress (native range almost all Europe to central Asia, now naturalized worldwide)

Reclassified species
The following species previously placed in Arabidopsis are not currently considered part of the genus.

Cytogenetics
Cytogenetic analysis has shown the haploid chromosome number (n) is variable and varies across species in the genus:

A. thaliana is n=5 and the DNA sequencing of this species was completed in 2001. A. lyrata has n=8 but some subspecies or populations are tetraploid. Various subspecies A. arenosa have n=8 but can be either 2n (diploid) or 4n (tetraploid).
A. suecica is n=13 (5+8) and is an amphidiploid species originated through hybridization between A. thaliana and diploid A. arenosa.

A. neglecta is n=8, as are the various subspecies of A. halleri.

As of 2005, A. cebennensis, A. croatica and A. pedemontana have not been investigated cytologically.

Quorum sensing in Arabidopsis 
Quorum sensing (QS) is a mechanism in which large groups of bacterial populations can communicate and regulate gene-expression. Arabidopsis thaliana can perceive and respond to such signalings, the chief molecule controlling QS in bacteria is N-acyl homoserine lactones (AHL). Many times Quorum sensing in bacteria will take place during viral infection of the plant to increase virulence gene expression, as well as bacteria that are in symbiotic relationship with the plant may still use QS to communicate with each other. Plants such as Arabodopsis thaliana have specialized receptors on the plasma membrane that allow them to hear (AHL) signals; however, the exact mechanism of perception is unclear. In response to QS plants can mimic (AHL) signals with halogenated furanone which can block (AHL) signals and mimic them in bacteria as well; the exact mechanism is still being researched. Furthermore, the AHL signals themselves are able to result in responses from the plant such as increased growth and or increased resistance mechanisms while there seems to also be a connection between (AHL) carbon length and plant response. 

The most influential molecules in quorum sensing are N-acyl homoserine lactones (AHLs). There are many types of AHLs, one of which is called "short chain N-hexanoyl-DL-HSL" (C6-HSL). It has been shown that when A. thaliana roots are exposed to C6-HSL, root length is significantly promoted by 1.2 fold, 14 days after inoculation. However, some other AHLs such as long chain homoserine lactones don't have this effect on root growth. Some AHL's such as (C6-HSL) do play a role in root growth regulation physiology. In fact, the exposure to this type of AHL actually leads to a decrease in root growth. Contact to C6-HSL with the roots of A. thaliana results in specific transcriptional changes that lead to increased growth in root cells. Genes that regulate cell growth by producing different levels of growth hormone, specifically auxin, are upregulated by this AHL. IAA induces gene expression of H+-ATPases, and aids in transporting these H+ pumped to the cell wall. This decreases pH in the cell wall as protons are pumped across which activates expanding proteins. This increases cell wall extensibility and thus stimulates cell wall extension. This happens because the loosening of the cell wall allows for turgor pressure to extend the length of the cell, resulting in overall root growth. It is important to note however that there are no significant differences in growth of the leaves when they were exposed to different AHLs, even C6-HSL. That being said, other AHLs may have different functions in quorum sensing such as inducing defense related transcriptional changes.

The defense-inducing AHLs in A. thaliana showed different characteristics in contrast to the growth-inducing AHLs in A. thaliana. When A. thaliana treated with C14-HSL and C12-HSL are compared in Pseudomonas syringae bacteria exposure, A. thaliana treated with C14-HSL derivatives exhibited smaller colony-forming unit numbers, conferring stronger bacterial resistance in A. thaliana. This shows that long-chain AHLs induce pathogen resistance while growth-inducing short-chain AHLs don't. However, it is important to note that resistance induced from long-chain AHL was only effective against the biotrophic and hemibiotrophic pathogens. It is speculated that mitogen-activated protein kinase (MAPK) plays a role in the resistance by transducing the external stimuli to extracellular responses. Nevertheless, more study is needed to further speculate the precise mechanism of AHL-induced resistance.

A prominent QS molecule (autoinducer) as discussed before is the AHL which is produced proportionally to the number of cells in the bacteria colony. Once produced, A. thaliana has receptors that are precise to different AHL in order to induce different interactions which are dependent on the recognition of lactone ring, amide group, and fatty acid chain length. The defense that can be induced through the sensing of AHL by its cognate receptor are the production of ethylene, salicylic acid, and jasmonic acid. Although the mechanism/pathway of these responses are not understood as of yet completely for A. Thaliana, the response of production of jasmonic acid and salicylic acid and alongside ethylene allows for a shifting of focus from plant growth to the defense against bacteria. Production of jasmonic acid, salicylic acid, and ethylene production works on the defense against bacteria and jasmonic acid for the root and shoots, salicylic acid for the induction of local and systemic acquired resistance against different bacteria, and ethylene modulates the plant's immune responses. Overall, it is obvious how plants such as A. thaliana with capability to detect quorum signaling can use this to their advantage by increasing defenses against pathogenic bacteria. Also being able to detect various types of QS allow A. thaliana to increase certain growth factors, all advantageous during growth in a competitive environment.

References

Further reading
 Al-Shehbaz, I. A., O'Kane, Steve L. (2002). Taxonomy and Phylogeny of Arabidopsis (Brassicaceae). The Arabidopsis Book: 1-22.
Ceccato, Luca; Masiero, Simona; Sinha Roy, Dola; Bencivenga, Stefano; Roig-Villanova, Irma; Ditengou, Franck Anicet; Palme, Klaus; Simon, Rüdiger; Colombo, Lucia (2013-06-17). Grebe, Markus (ed.). "Maternal Control of PIN1 Is Required for Female Gametophyte Development in Arabidopsis". PLoS ONE. 8 (6): e66148. doi:10.1371/journal.pone.0066148. ISSN 1932-6203. PMC 3684594. PMID 23799075.
O'Kane Jr, S. L., i Al-Shehbaz, I. A. (1997). A synopsis of Arabidopsis (Brassicaceae): Novon 7: 323–327.
 O'Kane Jr, S. L., i Al-Shehbaz, I. A. (2003). Phylogenetic position and generic limits of Arabidopsis (Brassicaceae) based on sequences of nuclear ribosomal DNA: Annals of the Missouri Botanical Garden 90 (4): 603–612.
  (Note that in 2013 ASPB decided to stop publishing new chapters.)

 
Brassicaceae genera